is a Japanese radio program broadcast by Nippon Broadcasting System and other radio stations from 1–5 am (JST). It preempts broadcasts from TBS Radio's programming heard on stations under both JRN and NRN (TBC Radio, CBC Radio, etc.).

DJs
The day of the week below are for the evening preceding in Japan, i.e. day in UTC.
 Mondays – Thursdays, 13:00 UTC – 15:00 UTC with "All Night Nippon Music 10 (オールナイトニッポンMUSIC10)" (aired on 11 radio stations in Japan)
 Mondays: Ryoko Moriyama
 Tuesdays: Anju Suzuki
 Wednesdays: Yuko Natori (first and third Wednesday), Chisato Moritaka (second Wednesday), Kaori Kishitani (fourth Wednesday)
 Thursdays: Marina Watanabe
 Mondays – Saturdays, 16:00 UTC – 18:00 UTC with "All Night Nippon (オールナイトニッポン)" (aired on 36 radio stations in Japan)
 Mondays: Creepy Nuts
 Tuesdays: Gen Hoshino
 Wednesdays: Nogizaka46
 Thursdays: Ninety-nine
 Fridays:  Shimofuri Myojo
 Saturdays: Audrey
 Mondays – Thursdays, 18:00 UTC – 19:30 UTC with "All Night Nippon 0(ZERO) (オールナイトニッポン0(ZERO))" (aired on 11 radio stations in Japan from 18:00 UTC until 19:00 UTC, and on 9 radio stations from 19:00 UTC until 19:30 UTC )
 Mondays: Fuwa-Chan
 Tuesdays: Pekopa
 Wednesdays: Nobuyuki Sakuma
 Thursdays: Magical Lovely
 Fridays, 18:00 UTC – 20:00 UTC with "All Night Nippon 0(ZERO) (オールナイトニッポン0(ZERO))" (aired on 11 radio stations in Japan from 18:00 UTC until 19:00 UTC, and on 9 radio stations from 19:00 UTC until 20:00 UTC )
 Fridays: Sanshiro
 Saturdays, 14:30 UTC – 16:00 UTC with "SixTONES No All Night Nippon Saturday Special (SixTONESのオールナイトニッポンサタデースペシャル )" (aired on 34 radio stations in Japan)
 SixTONES
 Saturdays, 18:00 UTC – 20:00 UTC with "All Night Nippon 0(ZERO) (オールナイトニッポン0(ZERO))" (aired on 22 radio stations in Japan from 18:00 UTC until 19:00 UTC, on 6 radio stations from 19:00 UTC until 19:30 UTC, and on 5 radio stations from 19:30 UTC until 20:00 UTC )
 weekly

Jingle
Before commercial breaks, a jingle is sung. The current one is performed by Gen Hoshino.
 
Other artists who sang the ANN Jingle are these:

 kz (livetune) x HachiojiP (Vocal:Hatsune Miku)
 Man with a Mission
 Yu Sakai
 Girl Next Door
 Remark Spirits
 !wagero!
 Hanako Oku
 Tommy February6
 Sum 41
 Changing My Life (.com)
 savage genius (SUPER)
 smorgas
 Unknown
 Ram Jam World
 Charmysmile & Greenhead
 Ken Hirai
 L⇔R
 Selfish
 Keizo Nakanishi
 To Be Continued
 Crayon-sha
 Hiroko Taniyama
 Miyuki Nakajima
 Junko Ohashi
 Taeko Onuki
 Toshiki Kadomatsu
 Mariya Takeuchi
 Tatsuro Yamashita
 EPO
 The Three Graces

Popular culture
In 1986, Nintendo developed All Night Nippon Super Mario Bros., a special Family Computer Disk System version of Super Mario Bros., as a contest prize for  listeners.  The game mostly consisted of levels from the original Super Mario Bros., though it also included some levels, graphics, and other gameplay changes from the Japanese Super Mario Bros. 2.  Some enemies, characters, and level elements had their graphics changed to reflect people or symbols associated with All Night Nippon or the Nippon Broadcasting System.

References

External links
 allnightnippon.com

Japanese talk radio programs
1967 radio programme debuts